A rent strike is a method of protest commonly employed against large landlords. In a rent strike, a group of tenants come together and agree to refuse to pay their rent en masse until a specific list of demands is met by the landlord. This can be a useful tactic of final resort for use against intransigent landlords, but carries the obvious risk of eviction and bad credit history in some cases.

Historically, rent strikes have often been used in response to problems such as high rents, poor conditions in the property, or unreasonable tenancy demands; however, there have been situations where wider issues have led to such action.

Notable rent strikes

Europe

Glasgow
During the Irish Land War of the 1880s and during World War I when the landlords of tenement buildings in Glasgow sought to take advantage of the influx of shipbuilders coming into the city and the absence of many local men to raise rents on the tenements' remaining residents. These women left behind were seen as an easy target and were faced with a rent increase of up to 25% and would be forcibly evicted by bailiffs if they failed to pay. As a result of this rent increase, there was a popular backlash against the landlords and a rent strike was initiated. This was led by Mary Barbour, Mary Burns Laird, Helen Crawfurd, Agnes Dollan, and other women who were dubbed 'Mrs. Barbour's Army', who lived in the housing that were experiencing rent increases. The Glasgow Women's Housing Association was led by these women and during rent strikes, women would forcibly prevent the bailiffs from entering the tenements to deliver eviction notices by pelting them with flour bombs, pulling down their trousers, or throwing them into the 'midden' (trash) in the back court of tenement buildings. The strikes soon spread, not only across the tenants of Glasgow, but across Glasgow workplaces. This became an overwhelming success, as Glasgow was a main producer of munitions for the war effort of WWI. These strikes moved out from Glasgow and on to other cities throughout the UK, and influenced the government, on 27 November 1915, to introduce legislation to restrict rents to the pre-war level. The Rent Restriction Act, 1915, was implemented after a protest held in Glasgow, by workers and tenants in support of five women who were taken to court for refusing to pay their rent.
The Leeds rent strike in 1914
In early January 1914, around 300 tenants living in the Burley area of Leeds went on rent strike against a 6d increase in rents imposed by the landlords. The rent increase had been called for by the Leeds branch of the Property Owners Association. At a mass meeting of the tenants on Sunday January 10, the rent strike organisers called for a citywide protest against the increase. A week later, the Leeds Trades Council hosted a Labour conference intended to organise mass rent resistance. A Tenants Defence League was formed with a central committee of nine and a mission to spread the rent campaign across the city through a series of public meetings and neighbourhood canvassing.  The strike lasted eight weeks.  In the end, committee members had been evicted and blacklisted from renting any other home in the area.
Kirkby Rent Strike
A 14-month-long rent strike initiated by 3,000 tenants on October 9, 1972 in the town of Kirkby, outside Liverpool, against the Housing Finances Act, caused a £1 rent rise.  A group of women on the Tower Hill estate formed a discussion and support group to help themselves and their families through the factory closure crisis when the Housing Finances Act was passed these women formed an Unfair Rents Action Group and responded by organizing the rent strike  
Highland Land League
Scotland 1880s
Barcelona mass rent strike 1931 
Between 5,000 and 100,000 people were out on rent strike 
The Gothenburg Rent Strikes 1930s
During the 1930s the Gothenburg Tenants´ Movement launched a rent-reduction campaign, using calls to boycott, cancellation of contracts and rent strikes to further their goals. Almost two thousand properties were affected and thousands of tenants got rent reductions as a result. The organized landlords retaliated and during the Olskroken Conflict 1936-1937 hundreds of tenants were evicted. The Olskroken conflict ended in a loss for the landlords, signalling the beginning of the end for tenant militancy in Gothenburg.
Northern Ireland
During "The Troubles" (1960s-1980s) in Northern Ireland, participants in the civil rights movement withheld rent and council rates from local councils in protest at internment.
University College London
Originally starting in 2015 with just 60 students, by 2016 a rent strike movement involving over one thousand students at University College London withholding their rent had formed, eventually winning hundreds of thousands of pounds in concessions. This rent strike spread to other UK universities, with many setting up "Cut The Rent" campaigns. Since this 2016 rent strike there have been rent strikes also in 2017 and 2018 at UCL, continuing to demand cheaper rents and better conditions, which have also gone on to win over £1.5 million.

Africa

South Africa
massive rent strikes 1980s to end Apartheid and gain ownership of housing by the tenants. The government sent in troops in Soweto in 1987. "Residents of some public housing have not paid their rents in several years, and in many cases officials have stopped trying to collect and have turned ownership over to tenants. In Soweto, for instance, Government officials say at least 50,000 rental units have been given to tenants."

North America
Anti-Rent Movement of New York 1839–1845
The Anti-Rent Movement (also known as the Anti-Rent War and Helderberg War) was a tenants' revolt in upstate New York in the period 1839–1845. The Anti-Renters declared their independence from the manor system run by patroons, resisting tax collectors and successfully demanding land reform.

New York City Rent Strike in 1907
In 1907, in response to rising rents due to housing shortages 10,000 families in lower Manhattan went on rent strike.  One of the primary organizers was 16-year-old Pauline Newman, housewives and women working in the garment industry. It lasted from December 26 until January 9 and led to about 2,000 families having their rents reduced.

Communist Party and American Labor Party efforts in the 1930s and 40s
During the Great Depression and through the end of World War II, labor unions played a major role in the mass-mobilization of the working class. These labor unions combined forces with leftist political organizations like the Communist Party and American Labor Party to rally for three major policy changes: rent control, public housing, and building-code enforcements.

New York City rent strike over repairs
In the winter of 1963-1964, a rent strike erupted in Harlem. It was led by Jesse Gray, a tenant organizer there since 1953. The focus of the strike was not rent levels but poor maintenance.

National wave of rent strikes throughout the US in 1960s and early 70s
Rent strikes spread through the US in response to the chronic neglect of repairs in both urban private and public housing stock. The 1960s were characterized by two distinct fronts within the tenant movement: (1) the tenant-student alliance led by Marie Runyon starting in 1961 that, though largely symbolic, generated media traction and political clout for the movement, and (2) a movement of radical Black movement participants led by the Black Panther Party and the Young Lords party who used a direct action approach to bring attention to the failings of the state and encouraged poor New York City neighborhoods to take charge of abandoned properties. After the Harlem rent strikes in 1963-4, it became a popular tactic both among students in university towns and public housing tenants who were living in squalid conditions due to lack of funding and racist federal policies.

South America
Tenants' strike of 1907
In 1907, a popular movement against the rise in rents in tenant houses in the city of Buenos Aires and other Argentine cities, popularly called conventillos, escalated into a rent strike. The strike began in August 1907, it lasted approximately 3 months and more than one hundred tenants participated in the movement, with thirty-two thousand workers on strike. It had a significant presence of anarchist and socialist activists.

See also
Eviction
Landlord harassment
Kirkby Rent Strike
Liverpool City Council v Irwin [1976] UKHL 1, a UK case on rent strikes, finding that the matter should be handled as a question of implied contract terms
UK labour law
Women of Quinn Square
Article 7A (NYC housing code)
Tenants union
Landlord harassment

References

On the Tenant Power Question by Dan Jakopovich
"New Joan of Arc Leads Rent Strike", The New York Times, December 27, 1907

Strikes (protest)
Affordable housing
Real property law
Renting